Operation Reconnect, an international protest orchestrated by Anonymous to increase awareness of the Church of Scientology's impositions in the personal lives of its members
Reconnect (Iris album), a remix album released by American band Iris in 2003
"Reconnect" (song), the 2006 debut single of Director, an Irish art rock quartet

See also
Connect (disambiguation)
Reconnected (disambiguation)
Reconnection